Senso '45 (also released internationally as Black Angel) is an Italian erotic drama film written and directed by Tinto Brass, based on the novella Senso by Camillo Boito, also which inspired  Luchino Visconti's 1954 film.

Instead of being set during the Third Italian War of Independence, the film is set in Venice during the last months of the fascist regime.

Plot
Livia Mazzoni, the wife of a senior manager of MinCulPop, departs from Asolo to Venice, where she meets her lover Helmut Schultz, an officer of the SS. During her car trip, Livia remembers the sexual drift that brought her up to that point, overwhelming her in a whirlwind of erotic adventures, illicit trafficking, shady characters who move in the shadow of the disarraying fascist regime in the final months of World War II.

Cast

 Anna Galiena as Livia Mazzoni
 Gabriel Garko as Helmut Schultz
 Antonio Salines as Carlo
 Franco Branciaroli as Ugo Oggiano
 Loredana Cannata as Ninetta
 Simona Borioni as Elsa

Tinto Brass said that at first Anna Galiena seemed doubtful about accepting the role, but then she insisted on having the part, and stubbornly asked to audition. So she went to the director's studio in Isola Farnese where, in order to guarantee the utmost privacy, Brass covered the glass panels of the door with a dark cloth. The actress undressed completely naked and told Brass that her initial uncertainty stemmed from the fact that she had little pubic hair.

Production
Tinto Brass re-adapted the source novella as Senso '45 in 2002 when he read it and found himself unsatisfied with Visconti's rather liberal adaptation. The film starred Anna Galiena as Livia and Gabriel Garko as her lover. The story of the film is much more faithful to Camillo Boito's work than the earlier adaptation in terms of tone and story, but the action was transported from the War of Unification to the end of World War II, with Remigio becoming a Nazi Lieutenant and Livia updated to being the wife of a high ranking Fascist official. Brass later explained that the change in time was made because he did not want to compete with Visconti's vision of Risorgimento-era Italy.

Unlike the 1954 version, Senso '45 did not romanticize the affair between Livia and Remigio/Mahler (now named "Helmut Schultz" in the new adaptation). Rather, the film  showed it as a clinical study of vanity and lust. The film won Italian cinema's "Silver Ribbon" Award for best costume design.

Awards and nominations

Nastro d'Argento Awards (2002)
 Nastro d'Argento for Best Costume Design to Alessandro Lai and Alberto Moretti

References

External links

2002 films
2000s erotic drama films
Italian erotic drama films
2000s Italian-language films
Films set in the 1940s
Films set in Venice
Films about Fascist Italy
2002 drama films